Budaörs Airport,  is an airport located in the 11th district of Budapest, Hungary and was named after the neighboring town Budaörs. Now serving general aviation, it was once Hungary's only international airport.

History
This was a very small airfield, and a replacement was established at Budaörs, at the south-western limit of Budapest's city boundary.

Planning for the airport started in 1935, and in 1936, design competitions for the terminal and main hangar were held. Construction started the same year, and the terminal was completed in 232 days, being opened on 20 June 1937. The main architect of the terminal was Virgil Bierbauer, and it is considered one of his finest works. Its grand main hall was particularly noteworthy. The building still exists, but is not accessible to the public.

The main hangar was also completed in 1937. It is still in use today. The terminal and the main hangar are protected historical monuments.

The airfield was completed in the summer of 1937, immediately becoming the main and the only international airport of Hungary, and the home base of Malert (the forerunner airline of Maszovlet, which later became Malév Hungarian Airlines).

Airlines and routes
The services operated in the summer of 1938 are shown here:

A service from Heston via Frankfurt was started by British Airways Ltd in April 1939, using Lockheed Model 14 Super Electra aircraft.

By 1950, Malert had been replaced by Maszovlet, 51% owned by the USSR, which operated services to Bratislava, Prague, Bucharest and Venice. Other airlines operating into Budaörs were Aeroflot, Czech Airlines, KLM, JAT Jugoslovenski Aerotransport, LOT Polish Airlines, and Transadriatica.

End of airline service
The need for the replacement of Budaörs by a larger airport had been clear since 1939. Hills surrounding Budaörs Airport, a lack of room for expansion, and the need for longer, hard runways led the development of what would become Budapest Ferihegy International Airport. Ferihegy was ready in 1943, but bombing during World War II caused extensive damage to it. As Budaörs had survived the war relatively intact, it continued its service as the primary international airport until repairs at Ferihegy were completed. Ferihegy was reopened on 7 May 1950, and a Lisunov Li-2 flew in from Budaörs to mark the occasion.

All international services transferred from Budaörs shortly afterwards, and recreational flying and parachuting activities which had gone on at Ferihegy moved to Budaörs.

Current operations
Budaörs is now an active general aviation airport, with many light aircraft and gliders based there. It is home to several recreational- and flight training businesses, as well as of the Goldtimer Foundation, which restores and regularly gives passenger rides on its vintage aircraft, like the Lisunov Li-2, Polikarpov Po-2, Rubik R-18 Kánya and the Rubik R-11b Cimbora.

References

External links
 Official website
 Goldtimer Foundation

1937 establishments in Hungary
Airports established in 1937
Airports in Hungary
Transport in Budapest
History of Budapest